Seredskaya is a rural locality (a village) in Moseyevskoye Rural Settlement, Totemsky District, Vologda Oblast, Russia. The population was 141 as of 2002.

Geography 
Seredskaya is located 67 km northwest of Totma (the district's administrative centre) by road. Pelevikha is the nearest rural locality.

References 

Rural localities in Tarnogsky District